El Viso del Alcor is a city located in the province of Seville, Spain. , the city has a population of 19,191 inhabitants.

References

External links
Official website

Municipalities of the Province of Seville